Ervinas Merfeldas (born 18 August 2002) is an Irish ballroom and Latin dancer and choreographer.

Early life 
Merfeldas was born in Celbridge in Kildare. He attended Scoil Na Mainistreach. He has a younger brother.

Career 
Merfeldas has been dancing since the age of seven. He is trained in ballroom and latin dancing.

In 2016, Merfeldas partnered with Gabija Raciute and competed in the WDSF World Championship in Romania. In 2017, Merfeldas and Raciute finished in fifth place in the British Dance Federation Junior Latin Championships. In 2019, Merfeldas and Raciute reached the final of the World Dance Championships - Latin discipline. They eventually finished in sixth place in the final. In 2022, it was announced that Merfeldas would make his acting debut in The Blonde Bombshell, a stage show based on Marilyn Monroe's life which is due to premiere on 20th November, 2022 in The Helix, Dublin.

Dancing with the Stars 
On 22 December 2021, Merfeldas was announced as one of the new professionals to join the fifth season of the Irish version of Dancing with the Stars. Merfeldas was partnered with model, influencer and daughter of Ronan Keating and Yvonne Connolly, Missy Keating. Merfeldas and Keating performed their first routine on the opening week of the show 9th January 2022 to mixed reviews from the judges and a score of 16. Merfeldas and Keating received high praise in Week 4 when they performed a Contemporary Ballroom inspired by the film, Wolfwalkers. In the sixth week of the competition Keating tested positive for COVID-19 meaning the couple were unable to dance. They were given a bye to the following week. On 20th February 2022, Keating and Merfeldas were eliminated from the competition following a dance off against Erica-Cody and Denys Samson.

On 4 March, it was announced that Merfeldas would partner Erica-Cody when her regular professional partner, Denys Samson, tested positive for COVID-19. On 13 March, it was announced that Merfeldas would partner Ellen Keane when her regular professional partner, Stephen Vincent, tested positive for COVID-19. Merfeldas was publicly praised for his contribution and ability to step in at such short notice.

Merfeldas returned for the sixth series in 2023, partnered with Republic of Ireland footballer, Stephanie Roche. They were the fourth couple to be eliminated following the first dance-off against Suzanne Jackson and Michael Danilczuk.

Series 5 – with celebrity partner Missy Keating

*Due to Keating testing positive for COVID-19 the couple did not dance in Week 6, but were given a bye to compete in the following week.

Series 6 – with celebrity partner Stephanie Roche

References 

2002 births
Living people
Ballroom dancers